Bork may refer to:

Bork (surname)
Robert Bork, jurist
Bork (comics), a fictional superhero in the DC Comics universe
Bork (company), a European home appliance manufacturer
Börk, Hanak, Turkish village
DoggoLingo, also known as bork, an Internet language of words used to refer to dogs
Bork, village, now part of Selm

See also
The Swedish Chef, a Muppet who appeared in The Muppet Show, was known for his exuberant interjection of "Bork, bork, bork!"
Bork Lazer